Salvadora oleoides is a small bushy evergreen tree found in India and Pakistan and southern Iran.

The root and stem possess various antimicrobial agents and is traditionally used as toothbrush in Pakistan and India.

Habitat
The vann is commonly found in and around Sandal Bar, and is reserved for use as grazing sources for local peasant villages.  In addition, a number of trees have been preserved to provide shade for cattle.

Wood

The vann is mostly non-woody and the small amount of wood that it has is soft, light, and not particularly useful for any of wood's normal uses, notably building and heat. When burnt, it leaves a large quantity of ash, which can then be boiled down into a substance for treating mange in camels.

In literature

Jal-tree 
In the janamsakhis of Guru Nanak, he was found laying under a jal-tree whose shadow remained stationary to protect him from the sun.  Macauliffe identifies this tree as Salvadora oleoides.

See also
 "Pilu" is a Proto Dravidian word named after tooth word "Pal" for indicating tooth word
Pīlu - Mentioned in Mahābhārata.
 Salvadora persica—Toothbrush tree, peelu, or siwak

References

 RN Kaul (1963): Need for afforestation in the arid zones of India, LA-YAARAN, Vol 13
 RC Ghosh (1977): Hand book on afforestation techniques, Dehradun.
 RK Gupta & Ishwar Prakasah (1975): Environmental analysis of the Thar Desert, Dehradun.

Salvadoraceae
Flora of India (region)
Flora of Pakistan
Flora of Iran
Taxa named by Joseph Decaisne